Patrick Chapman (born 1968) is an Irish poet, writer and screenwriter.

Chapman's first published work was Jazztown, released in 1991 by Raven Arts Press. This was followed five years later by The New Pornography, a collection of poems described as "darkly humorous" by The Irish Times. His story collection, The Wow Signal (Bluechrome Publishing ) was published in 2007. He also wrote the Doctor Who audio drama, "Fear of the Daleks" (Big Finish, 2007).

Based on his own published story of the same name, he wrote the short drama film Burning The Bed, which starred Gina McKee and Aidan Gillen. Burning The Bed was a prizewinner at the 2004 Worldfest film festival in Houston, Texas and was also named Best Narrative Short at the DeadCENTER Film Festival in Oklahoma City, Oklahoma.

Chapman has also written five episodes of the children's television series, Garth and Bev, for Kavaleer Productions. This aired on RTÉ in 2009 and Cbeebies in 2010, and has worldwide distribution.

Chapman is the co-founder, along with writer Philip Casey, of irishliteraryrevival.com, which seeks to create "a place where readers could find books no longer available elsewhere, and where writers could get a new audience for their texts, while stimulating interest in their work as a whole" and where all the books are placed on the site under a Creative Commons License.

Bibliography

Poetry collections
His poetry collections include:
 Jazztown, (Raven Arts Press, 1991 )
 The New Pornography (Salmon Poetry, 1996 )
 Breaking Hearts And Traffic Lights (Salmon Poetry, 2007 )
 A Shopping Mall on Mars, (BlazeVOX, 2008 )
 The Darwin Vampires, (Salmon Poetry, 2010 )
 A Promiscuity of Spines: New & Selected Poems, (Salmon Poetry, 2012 )
 Slow Clocks of Decay, (Salmon Poetry, 2016 )

Stories
 The Wow Signal (Bluechrome, 2007)
 The Negative Cutter (Arlen House, 2014)

Film
 Burning the Bed (Songway Films/Fantastic Films, 2003)

Audio Play
 "Doctor Who: Fear of the Daleks" (Big Finish, 2007)

Television
 "Garth and Bev" Five episodes (Kavaleer Productions, 2009/2010)
 "Wildernuts" Six episodes (Kavaleer Productions, 2013)
 "Bubble Bath Bay" Two episodes (Telegael/Cuan/Essential, 2014)

References

External links
 Patrick Chapman Online
 Burning the Bed Website

Irish poets
Irish screenwriters
Irish male poets
Irish male screenwriters
Living people
Date of birth missing (living people)
Place of birth missing (living people)
1968 births